Margaret Ross Hislop (née Grant, 1894–1972) was a Scottish painter, working primarily with oil paint.

Personal life 
Hislop was born in West Calder, Scotland.

In 1921 she married the artist Andrew Healey Hislop (1887–1954), who was one of her teachers. Together they travelled widely, including to Sri Lanka (then Ceylon), Egypt, Canada and India. In 1926 the couple had a daughter, Vivien whose probable portrait is held at the RSA. Vivien also became an artist, working mainly in watercolours.

The Hislops were listed as living at 18 Cluny Avenue, Edinburgh in 1949. They were friends and neighbours of Anne Redpath when living in London Street in Edinburgh's New Town.

Margaret Hislop died in Edinburgh in 1972.

Artwork and Career 
Hislop attended Westminster School of Art and later Edinburgh College of Art, where she was awarded her diploma in 1916. In 1950 She was elected as an associate of the Royal Scottish Academy and in 1964 became a full member.

Throughout her career, Hislop exhibited at the Royal Academy from 1948 with a portrait of her daughter, the Royal Scottish Academy, the Royal Glasgow Institute of the Fine Arts and the Scottish Society of Women Artists.

Hislop painted a portrait of Anne Redpath while they were both in Paris, entitled L'Aperitif. Her works appear regularly for auction.

Artworks Held in Public Collections

References

External links 

 Margaret Hislop's artist profile on Art UK

1894 births
1972 deaths
20th-century Scottish painters